Journal of Persianate Studies is a peer-reviewed academic journal publishing articles on the culture of a vast geographical area (including Iran, Afghanistan, and Tajikistan, as well as the Caucasus, Central Asia, the Indian subcontinent, and parts of the former Ottoman Empire) where the Persian language has or has had a significant presence.

See also
Encyclopædia Iranica
Iranian studies

External links 
 https://brill.com/view/journals/jps/jps-overview.xml
 

Iranian studies journals
English-language journals
Publications established in 2008
Biannual journals
Brill Publishers academic journals